Stilbometopa are genus of biting flies in the family of louse flies, Hippoboscidae. There are 5 known species. All species are parasites of birds.

Distribution
Found throughout North, Central, and South America.

Systematics
Genus Stilbometopa Coquillett, 1899
S. fulvifrons (Walker, 1849)
S. impressa (Bigot, 1885)
S. legtersi Bequaert, 1955
S. podopostyla Speiser, 1904
S. ramphastonis Ferris, 1930

References

Parasites of birds
Hippoboscidae
Taxa named by Daniel William Coquillett
Hippoboscoidea genera